Selfie Type is a keyboard technology for mobile phones made by Samsung Electronics. It uses the front-facing camera (the selfie camera) to track the user's fingers, enabling the user to type on an "invisible keyboard" on a table or another surface in front of the phone.

It was introduced at the Consumer Electronics Show 2020 and is expected to be launched in 2020.

References 

Keyboard layouts